We Sing Pop! is a 2012 karaoke game part of the We Sing family of games, developed by French studio Le Cortex. The game features songs from the pop genre of music, covering popular songs from decades of music. The game was announced along with We Sing UK Hits and We Sing Rock! at E3 2011.

Gameplay
The gameplay is similar to the SingStar set of video games. Players are required to sing along with music in order to score points, matching pitch and rhythm. The game has anticheat technology whereby tapping or humming will register on the screen but no points will be awarded. We Sing Pop! also contains the addition of 'Star Notes' that allow the player to score even more points by matching the pitch and rhythm of certain hard to score parts of songs.

 30 full licensed songs with music videos where available
 Solo Modes - Solo, Blind and Expert.
 Multiplayer modes - Group Battle, We Sing, Versus, Pass the Mic, First to X, Expert, Blind, Marathon.
 Real Karaoke mode
 Jukebox mode
 Singing Lessons
 Award System
 Customisable backgrounds
 Four Microphones
 Integrates with a USB hub

Due to hardware limitations with the Wii only having two USB ports, a standard USB hub can be used to play with three or more players. The game uses the standard logitech USB microphone for the Wii.

Track list
Below is the whole list of 30 tracks.
 
 Adele - Rolling in the Deep
 Bruno Mars - Just The Way You Are
 Coldplay - Clocks
 Cyndi Lauper - Girls Just Want to Have Fun
 Enrique Iglesias - Hero
 Fergie - Big Girls Don't Cry
 Flo Rida ft. David Guetta – Club Can't Handle Me
 Florence + The Machine - Dog Days Are Over
 Hanson - MMMBop
 Jason Mraz - I'm Yours
 Jessie J - Nobody's Perfect
 Kelis - Milkshake
 The Killers - When You Were Young
 Lady Gaga - Bad Romance
 Lady Gaga - Born This Way
 Nelly Furtado - I'm Like a Bird
 Nicole Scherzinger - Don't Hold Your Breath
 Outkast - Hey Ya!
 Owl City - Fireflies
 Peter Andre ft. Bubbler Ranx - Mysterious Girl
 Pussycat Dolls - When I Grow Up
 Rihanna - Don't Stop the Music
 Scissor Sisters - I Don't Feel Like Dancin'
 Sonny & Cher – I Got You Babe
 Tinie Tempah ft. Eric Turner - Written in the Stars
 Vanilla Ice - Ice Ice Baby
 Village People - Y.M.C.A.
 Wet Wet Wet - Love Is All Around
 Wham! - I'm Your Man
 Wretch 32 ft. Example - Unorthodox

See also
We Sing
We Sing Encore
SingStar
Karaoke Revolution
Lips

References

External links 
We Sing Website

2012 video games
Karaoke video games
Multiplayer and single-player video games
Music video games
THQ Nordic games
Video games developed in France
We Sing
Wii games
Wii-only games
Wired Productions games